Tiptree railway station was on the Kelvedon and Tollesbury Light Railway, serving the village of Tiptree, Essex, England.

The station was opened in 1904. It was closed, along with the rest of the line for passengers, on 7 May 1951.

A short siding ran from the station into the Wilkin & Sons jam factory for freight traffic. The section between the jam factory and Kelvedon, through the closed Tiptree station, continued in use for freight traffic until 28 September 1962.

References

External links
 Tiptree station on navigable 1946 O. S. map

Disused railway stations in Essex
Former Great Eastern Railway stations
Railway stations in Great Britain opened in 1904
Railway stations in Great Britain closed in 1951
Tiptree